David Light (born 13 November 1991 in Takapuna, Auckland) is a Professional Boxer from New Zealand. He competed in the men's heavyweight division at the 2014 Commonwealth Games in Glasgow where he won the silver medal against Canada's Samir El-Mais. Light is the current WBO Global, International and Oriental cruiserweight champion.

Amateur Boxing 
David had reached the semifinal after knocking out Malaysia's Meeraj Omar in the second round of his first bout, before defeating Kenya's Charles Odhiambo Okoth in a unanimous decision.

Light joined fellow boxer, David Nyika, in bringing home rare Commonwealth Games boxing medals to New Zealand. The last time that two Kiwi boxers returned from the Commonwealth Games with both a gold and a silver medal was in the Perth Commonwealth Games in 1962.

Following his Commonwealth success, Light was full of admiration for the Kiwi team but made controversial remarks regarding professional boxing: "... us boys in the New Zealand team, we always joke that going pro is when you give up on actual boxing ... You're cashing in on your talent and you're fighting bums."

Other successes for Light in 2014 include placing 2nd in his events at the 2014 boxing tournaments held in Belgrade, Serbia and 3rd at the 2014 GeeBee Competitions. Light has been in the national team since 2011.

Professional Boxing Career

International fight, Regional titles 2018 - 2019 
In October 2018, Light took on Fijian boxer James Singh in his ninth fight of his professional boxing career. Light won the fight by first-round knockout. The following month, Light took on another Fijian boxer Savenaca Naliva for the WBF International Cruiserweight title. This is the first time in lights professional career that he fought for an international title. Light won the fight by third round stoppage, winning his first international title. In December 2018, Light took on Lance Bryant on a Joseph Parker undercard. Light won the fight by second round stoppage.

In May 2019, Light took a major risk by taking on two time world title challenger Australian Mark Flanagan for the vacant WBO Oriental Cruiserweight title. Light won the fight by Unanimous Decision. After winning the fight, Light received the ranking of 14th in the WBO. Light went on to fight another Australian World title contender Trent Broadhurst. Light won fight by third round stoppage with Broadhurst knocked down four times in the fight. The fight was surrounded by controversy for multiple reasons including Broadhurst coming into the fight with an ear injury and Light making the injury worse. One of the biggest controversy surrounding the fight was the judging on the fight. Before the stoppage, the judges did not recognize the knockdown that, giving incorrect scoring to the cards. Light finished his 2019 with the ranking of 8th in WBO, 14th in IBF, 30th in the WBC and 38th on Boxrec.

Covid 19, ACL Injury, World title eliminator 2020 - 2022 
Unfotunately due to COVID-19 pandemic, majority of 2020 was inactive. In December 2020, Light took on Mose Auimatagi Jnr, defending his WBO Oriental Cruiserweight title. Light won the fight by Unanimous Decision. Light will return to the ring after recovering from an ACL injury in 2022. Light would make is USA debut when he took on Anthony Martinez in May 2022, in Florida. This will be the biggest title fight of his professional career so far for the WBO International Cruiserweight title. Light won the fight by first-round knockout. Light took on Indian boxer Vikas Singh in October 2022 in his return to Australia. The fight was on a 19 fight card which was held on Lights promoter Matt Rose event. Light won the fight by second-round knockout. In December 2022, Light would return to Florida to take on Brandon Glanton in a WBO World title eliminator. Light defending his WBO International title and Glanton defending his WBO Global title. Light won the fight by a close Split Decision with the world title shot expected to happen in March or April 2023.

World title fight 2023 - Present 
On December 5, 2022, the WBO ordered negotiations between WBO World Cruiserweight champion Lawrence Okolie promoter Eddie Hearn and Lights promoter Matt Rose to negotiated a mandatory world title fight between the two boxers. The two were given 20 days to negotiate. On the 6th of December 2022, WBO announced that the World title fight will be going to the Purse bid on December 14 in Puerto Rico. On the 13th of December, Okolie team requested a 7-day extension to continue their negotiations between them and Lights team. Lights team supported the extension and WBO accepted. WBO stated if an agreement does not reach, the purse bid would be held on 22 December in Puerto Rico. It was revealed on 15 December that the world title fight would likely happen in the UK in March 2023. On the 23rd of December, it was announced that both team have come to an agreement and will fight in the UK on March 11. The fight will be promoted by Ben Shalom under UK Boxing promotion "Boxxer". This is the same promoter for Joseph Parker. Leading into the World title fight, he received a significant ranking increase in the world bodies including 1st with the WBO and 5th in the IBF.

Amateur Boxing Titles

2011 North Island Golden Gloves Tournament
Elite Heavyweight (91 kg)
 Defeated E Enoka in Semifinals
 Lost Tino Honey in finals

2011 New Zealand National Championship
Elite Heavyweight (91 kg)
 Defeated Kahukura Bentson in Quarterfinals
 Defeated Floyd Masson in Semifinals
 Defeated Tino Honey in finals

2012 New Zealand National Championship
Elite Heavyweight (91 kg)
 Defeated Hale Faiumu in semifinals
 Defeated Toa Leutele in finals

2013 New Zealand National Championship
Elite Heavyweight (91 kg):
 Defeated Floyd Masson in semifinals
 Defeated Tino Honey in finals

2014 Commonwealth Games
Heavyweight (91 kg)
 Defeated Muhammad Meeraj Omar (Malaysia) in Round of 16
 Defeated Charles Okoth (Kenya) in quarterfinals
 Defeated Stephen Lavelle (Scotland) in semifinal
 Lost Samir El-Mais (Canada) in final

Professional Boxing Titles
 Professional Boxing Commission New Zealand
 New Zealand National Cruiserweight Title
 World Boxing Foundation
 Intercontinental Cruiserweight Title 
 World Boxing Organisation
 Oriental Cruiserweight Title
 International Cruiserweight Title
 Global Cruiserweight Title

Professional boxing record

Personal life 
David is the youngest of eight children to New Zealand inventor Len Light who invented the world's first do-it-yourself yoghurt maker, founding the then family business of Easiyo in 1992 and later of New Zealand Pure Dairy Ltd.

Awards and recognitions 
2019 Gladrap Boxing Awards Boxer of the year (Nominated)
2019 Gladrap Boxing Awards Male boxer of the year (Nominated)
2019 Gladrap Boxing Awards Knockout of the year (Nominated)
2019 Gladrap Boxing Awards Champion of the year (Nominated)
2019 Gladrap Boxing Awards International fight of the year (Won)
2019 Gladrap Boxing Awards Worst cut of the year (Nominated)
2019 Gladrap Boxing Awards Best Looking male boxer of the year (Nominated)
2020 New Zealand Fighter Boxing Awards International Champion of the year (Won)
2020 New Zealand Fighter Boxing Awards Male boxer of the year (Won)
2022 New Zealand Boxing Awards Champion of the year (Won)
2022 New Zealand Boxing Awards International Fight of the year (Won)

References

External links 
 
 

1991 births
Living people
Heavyweight boxers
Cruiserweight boxers
Commonwealth Games silver medallists for New Zealand
Boxers at the 2014 Commonwealth Games
People from Takapuna
New Zealand male boxers
Commonwealth Games medallists in boxing
Medallists at the 2014 Commonwealth Games